A packet generator or packet builder is a type of software that generates random packets or allows the user to construct detailed custom packets. Depending on the network medium and operating system, packet generators utilize raw sockets, NDIS function calls, or direct access to the network adapter kernel-mode driver.

This is useful for testing implementations of IP stacks for bugs and security vulnerabilities.

Comparison

General Information

See also 
Packet crafting
Packet analyzer
Packetsquare

Network analyzers
Packets (information technology)